This is a list of hurricanes in Barbados in the Lesser Antilles, Caribbean.

Date : Storm name : Distance from storm eye-wall.

1950–58
September 2, 1951: Hurricane Hosa passes 60 miles to the north.

October 5, 1954: Hurricane Hazel passes 45 miles to the south.

September 22, 1955: Hurricane Janet passes miles to the south-east as a Category 2 hurricane

August 30, 1958: Hurricane Ella passes 50 miles to the north.

1960–69
July 10, 1960: Hurricane Abby passes close to Barbados as a tropical depression.

September 25, 1963: Hurricane Edith passes 30 miles to the north as a Category 2 hurricane.

August 28, 1965: Hurricane Betsy passes 40 miles to the north-east as a tropical depression.

September 29, 1966: Tropical Storm Judith passes 20 miles to the north.

All these hurricanes passed within 65 miles of the island's center.

September 6, 1967: Hurricane Beulah passes 25 miles to the north as a tropical depression.

September 25, 1968: Unnamed storm, 1968 passes 20 miles to the south as a tropical depression.

July 26, 1969: Unnamed Storm, 1969 makes landfall as a tropical depression.

1970–79
October 1, 1970: Unnamed Storm, 1970 passes 25 miles to the north as a tropical depression. 

August 20, 1970: Tropical Storm Dorothy passes 45 miles to the north as a tropical storm.

September 13, 1971: Hurricane Irene-Olivia passes 50 miles to the south as a tropical depression.

August 19, 1971: Tropical Storm Chloe passes 40 miles to the north as a tropical depression.

October 2, 1974: Hurricane Gertrude passes 55 miles to the south as a tropical storm.

October 7, 1976: Unnamed Storm, 1976 passes 60 miles to the north-west as a tropical depression.

August 8, 1978: Unnamed storm, 1978 makes landfall as a tropical depression.

August 29, 1979: Hurricane David passes 75 miles to the north-east.

June 23, 1979: Tropical Storm Ana passes 60 miles to the north as a tropical storm.

1980–88
August 4, 1980: Hurricane Allen passes just north of the island.

July 23, 1983: Unnamed Storm, 1983 passes 15 miles to the north.

July 25, 1984: Unnamed Storm, 1984 passes 50 miles to the north.

September 8, 1986: Tropical Storm Danielle passes 65 miles to the south.

September 21, 1987 Hurricane Emily passes 50 miles to the south.

September 9, 1988 Hurricane Gilbert passes 75 miles to the north-east.

1990–95
August 14, 1993: Tropical Storm Cindy passes 60 miles to the north.

September 9, 1994: Tropical Storm Debby passes 20 miles to the north.

September 14, 1995: Hurricane Marilyn passes 50 miles to the north-east.

August 25, 1995 Hurricane Iris passes 70 miles to the north.

2000–07
October 4, 2001 Hurricane Iris passes 25 miles to the south.

October 7, 2001: Tropical Storm Jerry passes 30 miles to the south-west.

September 23, 2002: Hurricane Lili passes 45 miles to the south.

August 4, 2004: Tropical Storm Bonnie passes 20 miles to the north.

September 7, 2004: Hurricane Ivan passes to the south. (Then as a Tropical Storm)

August 17, 2007: Hurricane Dean passes 65 miles to the north.

September 1, 2007: Hurricane Felix passes 70 miles to the south.

2010–present

October 30, 2010 – Hurricane Tomas skirts the southern coast of Barbados as a strong tropical storm. Upon striking the island and the rest of the Windward archipelago, Tomas becomes the latest hurricane on record in a calendar year to impact the region. At Grantley Adams International Airport, a wind gust of 105 mph (165 km/h) is documented. The same station measured  of rain. The strong winds knock down power lines and damage homes; an estimated 1,200 residences sustain damage as a result of Tomas. Overall damage amounts to US$8.5 million, though no deaths are reported.
August 18, 2017 - Hurricane Harvey made landfall as a storm. Winds left residents throughout Barbados without electricity, with the majority of outages occurring in Christ Church, Saint Joseph, Saint Lucy, and Saint Michael. Flooding washed one house off its foundation, while water entered some houses, forcing some people to evacuate. Bridges in Saint Andrew and Saint Joseph were damaged. Additionally, a fuel depot in Speightstown was flooded. Winds from Harvey ripped the roof off of a church.
July 23, 2020: Tropical Storm Gonzalo passes 12 miles to the southwest.
July 2, 2021: Hurricane Elsa passes just south of the island.

See also
 :Category:Atlantic hurricane seasons
 List of Cuba hurricanes
 Impact of hurricanes on Caribbean history

References

External links

Always a near miss for Barbados, Barbados Meteorological Service & The Barbados Museum and Historical Society

Barbados
 
Barbados
Hurricanes
Hurricanes